Allen Glen High School is a co-educational public school that is located in Roodepoort, Johannesburg.

History
Allen Glen High School first opened its doors in 1992. Its name was inspired by the name of the suburb, Allens Nek. William Pope was elected as the schools' first headmaster, with 199 pupils. The first pupils wore t-shirts and jeans but have since changed and now wear official school uniform.

Notable alumni

Mmusi Maimane - Politician, former President of the Democratic Alliance (South Africa)
Thulisile Phongolo - Actress

References

1992 establishments in South Africa
1990s in Johannesburg
Educational institutions established in 1992
High schools in South Africa
Public schools in Africa
Schools in Johannesburg